Twomile Creek is a  long 2nd order tributary to East Branch Oil Creek in Crawford County, Pennsylvania.

Course
Twomile Creek rises on the Britton Run divide about 0.75 miles southwest of Britton Run, Pennsylvania.  Twomile Creek then flows south through the Erie Drift Plain to East Branch Oil Creek at Centerville, Pennsylvania.

Watershed
Twomile Creek drains  of area, receives about 45.4 in/year of precipitation, has a topographic wetness index of 459.72 and is about 50% forested.

References

Additional Maps

Rivers of Pennsylvania
Rivers of Crawford County, Pennsylvania